Martin Kližan was the defending champion but lost in the first round to Matthias Bachinger.

Dominic Thiem won the title, defeating Albert Ramos Viñolas in the final, 7–6(7–0), 6–1.

Seeds
The top four seeds receive a bye into the second round.

Draw

Finals

Top half

Bottom half

Qualifying

Seeds

Qualifiers

Qualifying draw

First qualifier

Second qualifier

Third qualifier

Fourth qualifier

References

External links
 Main draw
 Qualifying draw

2019 ATP Tour
2019 Singles